Greenville High School is a public high school located in Greenville, Greene County, New York, U.S.A., and is the only high school operated by the Greenville Central School District.

Footnotes

Greenville (town), New York
Schools in Greene County, New York
Public high schools in New York (state)